Ahmed Ben Cheikh Attoumane (born 1938) is a former politician in the Comoros. A former presidential adviser, he served as Prime Minister of Comoros from 20 June 1993 until 2 January 1994, leaving his post amid a domestic crisis that saw public unrest. He replaced Saïd Ali Mohamed as Prime Minister.

References

1938 births
Living people
Prime Ministers of the Comoros